Wao officially the Municipality of Wao (Maranao/Iranun: Inged a Wao;), is a 2nd class municipality in the province of Lanao del Sur, Philippines. According to the 2020 census, it has a population of 50,366 people.

Wao is the only predominantly Catholic municipality in Lanao del Sur, with 80% of the population adhering to Roman Catholicism. Wao is the only municipality in the Philippines that starts with "W".

History
The LASEDECO resettlement program of then-President Ramon Magsaysay made possible the foundation of Wao as a municipality in Lanao del Sur province on February 22, 1961. The first settlers in the area were sixty (60) families of various ethnicity from the then-undivided Cotabato province. Only one person (Elvino B. Balicao, Sr) among the 1st batch of settlers became one of the Municipal Mayors of Wao. Mr Balicao, along with members of the 1st batch of 60 settlers that included the late couple Aludio & Sofia Emborgo, were welcomed by the native Muslim inhabitants of Wao led by Sultan Mamaco Saripada (the municipality's first appointed and elected mayor), Datu Tao Pagul and Datu Maki Saripada. They were treated to a sit-down meal in the house of Sultan Mamaco Saripada.

Geography
Wao is also surrounded by Amai Manabilang in the north and west, Bukidnon in the east, and Cotabato in the south.

Barangays
Wao is politically subdivided into 26 barangays.

 Amoyong
 Balatin
 Banga
 Buntongan
 Bo-ot
 Cebuano Group
 Christian Village
 Eastern Wao (Poblacion)
 Extension (Poblacion)
 Gata (Pizawaoan)
 Kabatangan
 Kadingilan
 Katutungan 
 Kilikili East
 Kilikili West
 Malaigang
 Manila Group (Poblacion)
 Milaya
 Mimbuaya
 Muslim Village
 Pagalongan
 Panang
 Park Area 
 Pilintangan
 Serran Village
 Western Wao (Poblacion)

Climate

Demographics

Economy

Sister cities
 Quezon City, since April 1990

References

External links
 Wao Profile at the DTI Cities and Municipalities Competitive Index
 [ Philippine Standard Geographic Code]
 Local Governance Performance Management System
 Philippine Census Information

Municipalities of Lanao del Sur